The Istituto Superiore di Sanità (Italian National Institute of Health, literally 'Higher Health Institute'), also ISS, is an Italian public institution that, as the leading technical-scientific body of the Italian National Health Service (Servizio Sanitario Nazionale), performs research, trials, control, counseling, documentation and training for public health. The Institute is under the supervision of the Ministero della Salute (Ministry of Health).

History

The official opening of the ISS, called Istituto di Sanità Pubblica (Institute of Public Health), took place on April 21, 1934.
The construction of the main building in Rome, designed by architect Giuseppe Amendola, started on July 6, 1931 and it was financed by the American Rockefeller Foundation.

In 1941 the Istituto di Sanità Pubblica assumed its present name of Istituto Superiore di Sanità

In 1958 the ISS came under the protection of the Ministry of Health, from the Ministry of Interior.

ISS Directors (then Presidents)
 Gaetano Basile (1934–35)
 Dante De Blasi (1935)
 Domenico Marotta (1935–61)
 Giordano Giacomello (1961–64)
 Giovan Battista Marini Bettolo Marconi (1964–72)
 Francesco Pocchiari (1972–89)
 Vincenzo Longo (1989)
 Francesco Antonio Manzoli (1989–93)
 Giuseppe Vicari (1993–95)
 Aurelia Sargentini (1995–96)
 Giuseppe Benagiano (1996–2001)
 Enrico Garaci (2001–13)
 Fabrizio Oleari (2013–14)
 Gualtiero Ricciardi (2015–18); Commissioner (2014–15)
 Silvio Brusaferro (2019–present), straordinary commissioner

Nobel Prize Winners
 Daniel Bovet
 Ernst Boris Chain
 Enrico Fermi
 Rita Levi Montalcini

Structure

Departments
 Environment and Primary Prevention 
 Cell Biology and Neurosciences
 Haematology, Oncology and Molecular Medicine
 Therapeutic Research and Medicines Evaluation
 Infectious, Parasitic and Immune-Mediated Diseases
 Veterinary Public Health and Food Safety 
 Technology and Health

National centres
 National AIDS Centre
 National Centre for Chemical Substances
 National Centre for Epidemiology, Surveillance and Health Promotion
Centre for Immunobiologicals Research and Evaluation
 National Centre for Rare Diseases
 Evaluation and Accreditation Body
 National Blood Centre
 National Transplant Centre

Technical services
 Service for Biotechnology and Animal Welfare
 Data Management, Documentation, Library and Publishing Activities

Bibliography
 Giorgio Bignami, Origins and Subsequent Development of the Istituto Superiore di Sanità in Rome (Italy) (on-line  (Italian)

References

External links
Official English website of the ISS

Medical and health organisations based in Italy
Medical research institutes in Italy
1941 establishments in Italy
Organizations established in 1941
Rome Q. VI Tiburtino
Food safety organizations
Regulation in Italy
National public health agencies